Charles William Howard (1823 – 10 September 1908) was an English cricketer who played in one first-class cricket match for Kent County Cricket Club in 1844. He was born and died in Bridge near Canterbury in Kent.

Howard married twice, had 12 children and worked as a Veterinary surgeon in Bridge.

References

1823 births
1908 deaths
English cricketers
Kent cricketers
People from Bridge, Kent